Lidiane Rafaela Lisboa (13 August 1984 in Guaíra, Paraná) is a Brazilian actress and television presenter.

Personal life 
The actress was raised by her great-grandparents, on a farm in the small town of Guaíra, in the interior of Paraná. The actress's mother became pregnant when she was only thirteen years old, and was forced to leave her daughter at the age of four to try to find work in São Paulo. The actress also never met her father. She revealed that in her childhood she liked to swim in rivers, climb trees and play with pigs and chickens.

Her life began to change at age 8, when her mother picked her up to live with her in São Paulo. At the age of 12, the actress began studying theater at school, deciding on the profession of actress. The actress had her first chance in the profession at the age of 15, when she passed an audition to act in the soap opera Um Anjo Caiu do Céu, but revealed that she could not do the soap opera because the childhood and adolescence court considered the role inappropriate for her age. her, which left her extremely frustrated, but she didn't give up on her dream of being an actress.

In 2001, she was approved in an audition by TV Globo to make the soap opera A Padroeira. Even still a minor, the role was approved by the juvenile court. Because of her role, she moved to Rio de Janeiro. With the end of the soap opera, his contract with Globo was not renewed. She lived alone in Rio de Janeiro and had no way to support herself - the financial help of her mother, the plastic artist Lídia Lisboa, was insufficient to keep her in the city, until another job came along. With no other alternative, she returned to live with her mother in São Paulo.

When she turned eighteen, she got a job as a bartender at a nightclub in São Paulo. From then on, due to fights with her mother, she left home and began to live alone in São Paulo. To supplement her income, she also worked as a waitress, nanny and cleaning lady. The actress only managed to return to Globo in 2004, but was always without a work contract for more than a year, between comings and goings to soap operas, she also made some appearances in cinema and theater. Her career only took off in 2016, when she signed a contract with Rede Record, and since then she hasn't stopped making soap operas.

Discreet about her sentimental life, at the age of 15 she had her first boyfriend, named Samuel. They were together for eight years, and after the breakup they remained friends. Lidi Lisboa revealed to the press that he helped her overcome her childhood difficulties and taught her to love others, revealing that they spent a year dating at a distance, when he stayed in São Paulo and she was making her first soap opera in Rio de Janeiro. , and that both were always very mature and knew how to deal with distance.

The actress, despite having been seen by the media over the years in the company of some actors, until then had not assumed any serious relationship, when in 2013 she reported that she was dating the actor from Rio Grande do Sul, Fábio Rhoden. From 2015 to 2020 the couple lived together in her apartment, in Recreio, a neighborhood in the West Zone of Rio de Janeiro. However, after her participation in A Fazenda 12, the couple ended up breaking up, currently Lidi remains single.

Career

2001-2014: Career Start 
The actress debuted on television in 2001 on TV Globo, playing the slave Brásia in "A Padroeira". Between 2004 and 2005, she was in the main cast of the series "Malhação" in the role of the young fighter Aline. In 2006, she made a cameo in the children's series Sítio do Picapau Amarelo as Jurema. In 2007, she joins the cast of the soap opera "Paraíso Tropical" in the role of Tatiana, a humble young woman, girlfriend of a troubled bad boy.

Between 2007 and 2009, she recorded appearances in series and series on the network: Faça Sua História and Casos e Acasos. In 2009, she participates in the 18h soap opera, as the beautiful maid Das Dores. In 2011, she participates in the soap opera "Insensato Coração" as the prisoner Cátia. In 2012, she acts in "Cheias de Charme", as the fun nanny Gracinha. In 2014, she stars in "Império" as the struggling Kelly.

2016-2019: Featured as "Jezebel" 
In 2016, he began a new cycle, becoming more important in his career, when he signed with Record TV, and was part of the main cast of the period soap opera "Escrava Mãe", in which he appears in the skin of Esméria, a long-suffering and ambitious slave, able to do anything to rise in life and ascend socially, being the main villain of the serial, the actress was highly praised by the public and critics. In 2017, she acts in the medieval soap opera "Belaventura" playing the sweet and cultured Tamar, a young lady of society, who falls in love with her teacher. In 2018, she returns to TV Globo, and makes a participation in the soap opera "Segundo Sol", as the police officer Suely. In 2019, she still acts in the miniseries "Se Eu Fechar os Olhos Agora" playing Maria Rosa, a young blessed woman, who suffers from racism on the part of the priest of her church. In 2019, she returns to RecordTV, and so far wins the most visible role of her career, when she was chosen to star in the macro-series "Jezabel", where she plays the cruel and merciless Phoenician Jezebel, who marked the history of humanity, by chasing the prophets of God. The actress also gains visibility, being the first black actress to be the protagonist of a biblical plot.

2020-present: A Fazenda 12, new projects and Netflix 
On September 8, 2020, she was confirmed as one of the twenty participants of the twelfth season of the reality show A Fazenda da RecordTV, being the fifteenth eliminated from the competition in a field against Biel and Jojo Todynho with 16.51% of the votes to stay, placing 6th in the competition. Lidi stayed at the house for 100 days, leaving only in the last week of the program.
With the participation in the reality, Lidi won many fans, leaving as one of the big names of the season. Soon, she was hired by the mynd8 company to manage the career.
On May 5, 2021, Rede Record announced the name Lidi Lisboa to present the online contents of the reality show Power Couple Brasil. Interviews with the eliminated couples, among other content aimed at the digital environment.
On September 1, 2021, Netflix announced "A Sogra Que Te Pariu", a sitcom series scheduled to premiere in 2022, where Lidi will play Alice, one of the protagonists of the plot.
Due to its good performance and public acceptance, on September 3, 2021, it was announced that Lidi Lisboa would also present the digital content of the reality show A Fazenda, along with Lucas Selfie, a former confinement colleague. She will interview participants who leave the competition each week.

Filmography

Television

Internet

Film

References

External links 

1984 births
Living people
People from Paraná (state)
Brazilian television actresses
Brazilian telenovela actresses